Adrian James Madise (born March 23, 1980) is a former American football wide receiver. Madise played college football for Texas Christian University.  During his junior and senior years in 2001 and 2002, he tallied 82 catches for  1,343 yards (16.4 yards per catch) and 7 touchdowns.  Madise was drafted by the Denver Broncos in the fifth round of the 2003 NFL Draft.  In June 2003, he signed a five-year contract with the Broncos.   He played in 11 games for the Broncos during the 2003 NFL season.  His longest gain for the Broncos was an 83-yard kickoff return. He signed with the Austin Wranglers in November 2006.

References

1980 births
Living people
People from Lancaster, Texas
American football wide receivers
TCU Horned Frogs football players
Denver Broncos players
Austin Wranglers players
Tampa Bay Buccaneers players